The Iksan Jewelry Museum is a museum in Iksan, South Korea.  It was built to provide cultural space related to Baekje relics for tourists and educate them about jewelry and knowledge of it including symbols.

References

Museums in North Jeolla Province
Iksan
Museums established in 2002
2002 establishments in South Korea
Jewellery museums